Azimut is the fifth studio album by Italian singer-songwriter Alice, released in 1982 on EMI Music.

Singles released from the album include "Messaggio" (1982), "A cosa pensano" (1982) and "Chan-son Egocentrique" (1983), the latter a duet with Franco Battiato. The track "Messaggio" was co-written by Battiato under one of his pseudonyms, "Albert Kui". The closing track "Laura degli specchi" ("Laura With The Mirrors") was written by singer-songwriter Eugenio Finardi, whose "Le ragazze di Osaka" Alice would later cover on her 1989 album Il sole nella pioggia.

An alternate version of the track "La Mano" appears on the 1987 album Elisir. Re-recorded versions of both "A cosa pensano" and "Chan-son Egocentrique" were included in the 2000 career retrospective Personal Jukebox.

Track listing
Side A
"Azimut" (Alice) – 3:44
"A cosa pensano" (Francesco Messina, Alice) – 3:42
"Animali d'America" (Alice) – 4:09
"Deciditi" (Alice) – 3:39
"Messaggio" (Alice, Albert Kui (pseudonym for Franco Battiato), Giusto Pio) – 3:46

Side B
"Principessa" (Alice) – 4:28
"La mano" (Alice) – 5:35
"Chan-son Egocentrique" (duet with Franco Battiato) (Franco Battiato, Francesco Messina, Tommaso Tramonti) – 3:52
"Laura degli specchi" (Eugenio Finardi) – 3:51

Personnel
 Alice – lead vocals, piano & synthesizer tracks A1, A3 & B2 
 Matteo Fasolino – keyboards, piano, synthesizer
 Alfredo Golino – drums, percussions
 Franco Testa – bass guitar
 Paolo Donnarumma  – bass guitar track A5
 Claudio Bizzarri – guitar
 Alberto Radius – guitar track A5 
 Claudio Pascoli – saxophone tracks A3 & B3  
 Giorgio Baiocco  – saxophone track A5
 Filippo Destrieri – keyboards tracks A5 & B4

Production
 Angelo Carrara – record producer
 Alice – musical arranger, sound engineer
 Matteo Fasolino – musical arranger, sound engineer
 Alfredo Golino – musical arranger, rhythm section
 Albert Kui (Franco Battiato) – musical arranger track A5
 Giusto Pio – musical arranger track A5
 Eugenio Finardi – musical arranger tracks B2, B4
 Enzo "Titti" Denna – sound engineer
 Recorded at Stone Castle Studios except tracks A5 & B4 at Radius Studio
 Mulino – sound mixing

Charts

References

External links

1982 albums
Alice (singer) albums
EMI Records albums
Italian-language albums